Maor (Meir) Zohar (born June 3, 1985) is a former Israeli footballer.

He was of a Tunisian-Jewish descent.

External links
Footballdatabase.eu profile

1985 births
Living people
Israeli Jews
Israeli footballers
F.C. Ashdod players
Hapoel Ashkelon F.C. players
Hakoah Maccabi Amidar Ramat Gan F.C. players
Hapoel Ra'anana A.F.C. players
Maccabi Be'er Sheva F.C. players
Sektzia Ness Ziona F.C. players
Maccabi Kiryat Gat F.C. players
Maccabi Ironi Ashdod F.C. players
Israeli Premier League players
Liga Leumit players
Footballers from Ashdod
Israeli people of Tunisian-Jewish descent
Association football midfielders